The 2019 Bulgarian Cup Final was the final match of the 2018–19 Bulgarian Cup and the 79th final of the Bulgarian Cup. The final took place on 15 May 2019 at Vasil Levski National Stadium, Sofia, Bulgaria. It was refereed by Nikolay Yordanov from Sofia.

The clubs contesting the final were Botev Plovdiv and Lokomotiv Plovdiv, who traditionally take part in the Plovdiv derby. Both teams have met on multiple occasions in the competition but never in the final itself. 

Lokomotiv won the final with the score of 1–0, claiming their first ever Bulgarian Cup title.

Route to the Final

Match

Details

References 

Bulgarian Cup finals
2018–19 in Bulgarian football
Botev Plovdiv matches
PFC Lokomotiv Plovdiv matches
Bulgarian Cup Final